ADPF 54 is a landmark case of the Supreme Court of Brazil. The minister relator Marco Aurélio Mello voted in favor of decriminalization of abortions involving anencephalic fetuses.

High Court decision

Judiciary representation

Legislative representation

Executive representation

Amici curiae

See also

 Abortion
 Abortion law
 Abortion in Brazil

References

Abortion law
Brazilian legislation
Abortion in Brazil